Eskildsen is a surname of Dano-Norwegian origin, and is most popularly used as a surname in the countries of Denmark and Norway. The first instance of the surname Eskildsen being used was in 1718 in what is now Akershus County, Norway. The first record of an Eskildsen immigration to the United States came in 1869. The surname also has variants such as Eskilsson (in Sweden) and Eskildson.

Notable people with the surname Eskildsen include:

Eigil Eskildsen (1922-1995), Danish GLBT rights pioneer
Joakim Eskildsen (born 1971), Danish photographer
Rosario María Gutiérrez Eskildsen (1899-1979), Mexican linguist and lexicographer

Sources

Norwegian-language surnames
Danish-language surnames